The Connecticut Audubon Society Coastal Center at Milford Point is a nature center and bird sanctuary in Milford, Connecticut, established in 1995. Over 300 different species of bird have been observed at this location. The Coastal Center is located on an  barrier beach—the Smith-Hubbell Wildlife Refuge & Bird Sanctuary—and is situated next to the  Charles E. Wheeler Wildlife Management Area at the mouth of the Housatonic River. The Coastal Center provides easy access to Long Island Sound and its many habitats: tidal salt marshes, barrier beaches, tide pools and coastal dunes, and utilizes these habitats for environmental education for youth and adults. These various environments and habitats support a variety of bird, plant and animal communities for observation and study. The Coastal Center also contains educational exhibits and live animals.

The Coastal Center aims to promote awareness of Long Island Sound's ecosystem, the birds and habitats it supports and to foster their preservation, in keeping with the mission of the Connecticut Audubon Society.

The center is one of five nature centers and 19 wildlife sanctuaries operated by Connecticut Audubon Society, which is not part of the National Audubon Society.

References

External links
 Connecticut Audubon Society Coastal Center at Milford Point

Buildings and structures in Milford, Connecticut
Tourist attractions in New Haven County, Connecticut
Natural history of Connecticut
Long Island Sound
Connecticut Audubon Society
Protected areas of New Haven County, Connecticut
Education in New Haven County, Connecticut
Nature centers in Connecticut
Protected areas established in 1995
1995 establishments in Connecticut